Tennessee state elections in 2020 were held on Tuesday, November 3, 2020. Primary elections for the United States Senate, United States House of Representatives, Tennessee Senate, and Tennessee House of Representatives were held on August 6, 2020.

Presidential election

President of the United States 

County results

Trump

Biden

Tennessee is a stronghold for the Republican Party, and is considered a reliable "red state." Tennessee has 11 electoral votes in the Electoral college. In the general election, Incumbent United States President Donald Trump won Tennessee with 60.66% of the vote.

The presidential primaries were held on March 3, 2020. Donald Trump won the Republican primary in a landslide victory over former governor Bill Weld of Massachusetts and former congressman Joe Walsh of Illinois. Vice President Joe Biden garnered the Democratic nomination, beating out Bernie Sanders of Vermont.

Results 

March 3, 2020, Primary Results

United States Congress

Senate 

County results

Incumbent Republican Senator Lamar Alexander announced that he would not run for re-election on December 17, 2018. Environmentalist, activist and Democratic nominee Marquita Bradshaw, the first black woman to win a major political party nomination in any statewide race in Tennessee, was defeated by Republican nominee Bill Hagerty, former United States Ambassador to Japan and former Commissioner of the Tennessee Department of Economic and Community Development.

Results 

August 6, 2020, Primary Results

House of Representatives 

District results

Republican

 

Democratic

Tennessee elected nine U.S. representatives, each representing one of Tennessee's nine congressional districts.

Results

State Legislature

State Senate 

Results by senate districts

Republicans:

Democrats:

No election: 
 

Elections for 16 of the 33 seats in Tennessee's State Senate were held on November 3, 2020. There was 1 open seat, and 15 incumbents that ran for re-election.

Close races
Two races were decided by a margin of under 10%:

State Assembly 

Winners:

The election of all 99 seats in the Tennessee House of Representatives occurred on November 3, 2020.

The Democratic Party retook the 90th district, where the incumbent John DeBerry had defected to become an independent. The Republican Party maintained their supermajority in the state house.

Close races
Seven races were decided by a margin of under 10%:

See also
 Elections in Tennessee
 Political party strength in Tennessee
 Tennessee Democratic Party
 Tennessee Republican Party
 Government of Tennessee
 2022 United States elections

Notes

References

External links
 
 
  (State affiliate of the U.S. League of Women Voters)
 
 . (Guidance to help voters get to the polls; addresses transport, childcare, work, and information challenges)
 

 
Tennessee